Zarandeh may refer to:
 Zarandeh, Binalud
 Zarandeh, Mazul